Ashoka is a 2006 Indian Kannada-language action film directed by Shivamani. The film stars Shiva Rajkumar, Sunitha Varma, and Tejashree. It was released on 17 March 2006.

Plot

Cast 
Shiva Rajkumar as Ashoka
Sunitha Varma
Tejashree
Srinivasa Murthy as the father
Vinaya Prasad as a cop
Shivamani as an undercover police investigator
Sathya Prakash
Sathyajit
Ashok
 Govinda Rao
Kishore

Production 
Ashoka is director Shivamani's first film with producer Ramesh Yadav, who also wrote the story. The film is the 14th one produced by Yadav.

Soundtrack 
Music by Sadhu Kokila. Lyrics written by K. Kalyan.

Release and reception 
Ashoka was released on 17 March 2006 after being delayed. K.N. Venkatasubba Rao of The Hindu opined that "Borrowing its plot straight from published sensational news stories, in a cut and paste format, Ashoka attempts to trace the nexus between the police and underworld in a despicable but undeniable fashion". R G Vijayasarathy of Rediff.com said that "Overall, Ashoka is good if you want to see another side of Shivaraj Kumar". The film was commercially unsuccessful.

References

External links 

2000s Kannada-language films
2006 action films
Indian action films